Lionel Price (6 February 1927 – 10 January 2019) was a British basketball player who competed in the 1948 Summer Olympics. Born in the Marylebone area of London's West End, he, at age 21, became the youngest member of the British basketball team, which finished twentieth in the Olympic tournament.

References

External links
 Lionel Price's profile at the British Olympic Association
 
 
 

1927 births
2019 deaths
British men's basketball players
Olympic basketball players of Great Britain
Basketball players at the 1948 Summer Olympics
People from Marylebone
Basketball players from Greater London